WSP Global Inc. is a Canadian company with American and British roots,  providing management and consultancy services to the built and natural environment. It is listed on the Toronto Stock Exchange. After the purchase of New York-headquartered professional services firm Parsons Brinckerhoff in October 2014, WSP Global effectively became one of the largest professional services firms in the world, with approximately 66,200 employees in 500 offices serving in 40 countries.

History

Origins of WSP
Williams Sale Partnership was established in 1969 in England by Chris Cole and three other partners. In 1976, it was a founding member of the Building Services Research and Information Association (BSRIA). It was first listed on the London Stock Exchange in 1987.

In the 1990s, the company expanded at home and overseas forming WSP Asia in 1995, incorporating T P O'Sullivan and Partners in 1997, acquiring US practices Cantor Seinuk and Flack + Kurtz in 2000, as well as buying Jacobson & Widmark (J&W) in Sweden in 2001 (J&W was founded in 1938), LT Consultants Oyj and EMP Projects Oyj in Finland in 2003 and, PHB Group in the UAE in 2005.

Genivar
After acquiring three firms and geographical expansion in 1993, the name of the Canadian firm GBGM was changed to Genivar Inc.

In August 2011, Genivar Inc. and Montreal-based architectural firm ARCOP announced an alliance.

Takeover
On 7 June 2012,  Genivar made a friendly takeover cash offer of £278 million (C$442 million) for WSP Group plc, headquartered in London. The offer was backed by WSP's board of directors as well as investors holding 37% of the company's shares and the take over was completed on 1 August 2012.
This merger created a professional-services firm with approximately 15,000 employees, working in over 300 offices worldwide.

The company reorganised its corporate structure on 1 January 2014, to create a parent company named WSP Global Inc. and adopted the common brand of WSP.

Subsequent acquisitions

In October 2014, WSP Global completed the purchase of New York-headquartered professional services firm Parsons Brinckerhoff from Balfour Beatty for USD$1.24 billion. The company has a network of approximately 170 offices and nearly 13,500 employees on five continents and became a wholly owned independent subsidiary. Together, WSP | Parsons Brinckerhoff is one of the largest professional services firms in the world with approximately 32,000 employees in 500 offices serving 39 countries.

In early 2015, WSP Global announced plans to expand to 45,000 employees by 2020. In October 2016, WSP purchased Mouchel Consulting from the Kier Group for approximately £75 million.

In January 2017, WSP | Parsons Brinckerhoff announced that it would assume the name "WSP USA", effective from May 2017. In August 2017, WSP made a takeover bid for Opus International Consultants.

In July 2018, WSP announced its intention to buy Berger Group Holdings Inc., parent of the group of companies operating under the name of Louis Berger Group, a Morristown, N.J.-based international professional-services firm, for $400 million.

In February 2020, WSP acquired US-based environmental consulting firm LT Environmental (LTE). On December 3, 2020, WSP acquired Canadian-based geotechnical, earth-science, and environmental consulting firm Golder for $1.14 billion.

On June 1, 2022, WSP announced an agreement of sale with Wood Group plc for the Environment & Infrastructure group (E&I) part of its business. The £1.6 bn acquisition was concluded in September 2022. In August 2022, WSP Global made an unsuccessful takeover offer to purchase RPS Group for £591 million. In September 2022, RPS received a counter takeover offer from Tetra Tech for £636 million with WSP opting not to increase its bid. RPS' shareholders voted to accept the Tetra Tech offer in November 2022.

In December 2022, WSP announced plans to acquire a 700-strong Swiss engineering firm, BG Consulting Engineers, based in Lausanne with offices in France, Portugal and Italy.

Projects
WSP projects include:
22 Bishopsgate, London, UK
56 Leonard Street, New York City, US
Old Oak Common railway station, London, UK
Perth Arena, Perth, Australia
Jerusalem Light Rail, Jerusalem, Israel and the West Bank

References

External links

Official site

Consulting firms established in 1959
Companies listed on the Toronto Stock Exchange
Companies formerly listed on the London Stock Exchange
Companies based in Montreal
Construction and civil engineering companies of Canada
Construction and civil engineering companies of the United Kingdom
Engineering companies of the United Kingdom
International management consulting firms
Management consulting firms of Canada
Engineering consulting firms of Canada
International engineering consulting firms
Canadian brands
1959 establishments in Quebec
British companies established in 1959
Construction and civil engineering companies established in 1959
Canadian companies established in 1959